Francois Henry Willem Mohede (born 6 February 1976), known as Frans Mohede, is an Indonesian singer, actor and Muay-thai instructor. He is the husband of the Indonesian artist Amara and He was a member of Lingua.

Life and career
Mohede was born on 6 February 1976 in Jakarta, His family is a combination of Dutch Moluccan and Sangirese descent. He is the cousin of the indonesian R&B artist Mike Mohede.

He founded in 1996 with his friends musicians, Amara and Arie Widiawan, the trio of country pop, Lingua. He followed a career in acting in TV series, as his wife after 1999, their proximity is such that they are apparuts together more than a dozen times on the screen.

Being an expert in martial arts, he opened in 2007 in Jakarta, the first training center Muay-thai of Indonesia. Since 2013, he was appointed president of the MPI (Muay-Thai Professional Indonesia). In December 2014, Mohede with his wife opened a second training center in Bali, in order to continue promoting the sport across the country.

Personal life
On 1 December 1999, Mohede married his childhood friend, the singer Amara who he was dating since 1991. The couple are not in the same religious denomination, so since Indonesian law makes it difficult to do interfaith marriage since 1974, the couple had a civil marriage to Hong Kong.

They are the parents of three sons: Mahija Nathaniel Sambarana Aryantawira (born 8 June 2004), Janitra Nathaniel Sambawikrama (born on 8 September 2006) and Rajaswa Nathaniel Singkarawang Mohede (born on 17 October 2008).

Discography

With Lingua

Studio album 

 Bila Kuingat (1996)
 Bintang (1998)
 Mampu Bertahan (2016)

Singles 
 Good Times (2015)
 Arti Sebuah Keangkuhan (2017)
 Jangan Kau Henti (2019 version) (2019)
 Bila Kuingat (2019 version) (2019)
 Temani Malamku (2020)

Filmography

Film 
 Misi: 1511

Television 
 Orde Cinta
 Bukan Pilihan
 Hadiah Terindah
 Azab Anak Tak Tau Diri

Soap opera 
 Mahligai Diatas Pasir
 Cinta Tak Pernah Salah
 Bukan Impian Semusim
 Kembali Ke Fitri
 Petualangan Intan & Oddi
 Aku Cinta Kamu
 Nyonya-Nyonya Sosialita
 Serpihan
 Lia

Advertisements
 Laserin
 Allianz

References

External links
 Official Website
  Profil Frans Mohede Kapanlagi.com
 

1976 births
Living people
21st-century Indonesian male singers
20th-century Indonesian male singers
Male actors from Jakarta
Indonesian male television actors
Indonesian Muay Thai practitioners
Indo people
Moluccan people
Indonesian people of Dutch descent
People of Sangirese descent
Indonesian people of Filipino descent
People from Maluku (province)
Indonesian dance musicians
Indonesian Christians
Indonesian soul singers
Indonesian country singers
Indonesian pop singers
Indonesian male dancers
Singers from Jakarta